ONCF (from French: Office National des Chemins de Fer;  Al-Maktab al-Waṭaniy lil-Sikak al-Ḥadīdiyyah; Moroccan National Railways Office) is Morocco's national railway operator. ONCF is a state-owned company that is under the control of the Ministry of Equipment, Transport and Logistics and is responsible for all passenger and freight traffic on the national railway network. The company is also responsible for building and maintaining the rail infrastructure.

The ONCF employs around 7,845 employees and has a network of 3,600 km, all  standard gauge of which 1,300 km is electrified (2015). The general director of ONCF is Mohamed Rabie Khlie.

Creation
The railways have been state-owned since the formation of ONCF, created in 1963 as a merger of various private companies:
 Railways of Morocco - CFM (French: Compagnie des chemins de fer du Maroc)
 Railway of Eastern Morocco - CMO (French: Compagnie du chemin de fer du Maroc oriental)
 Franco-Spanish company of Tanger-Fès - TF (French: Compagnie franco-espagnole du Tanger-Fès)
 Mediterranean-Niger-Railway (MN) (French Chemins de Fer de la Méditerranée au Niger)

Business mission 
ONCF performs several operations and has as a mission to:
 Exploit the rail infrastructure
 Study, build and maintain the train lines in the network
 Exploit all the businesses related to railway services locally and nationally

Institutional reforms 
ONCF has undergone several institutional reforms before becoming a state-owned company.  Further institutional reforms are expected in order to open the national railway market to competition. Plans were made in 2007 to re-form it into a limited company fully owned by the Moroccan State to be called SMCF (French: Société Marocaine des Chemins de Fer) but this hasn't materialized by the planned deadline in 2012.

Network 
The network has a north–south track from Tangier via Rabat and Casablanca to Marrakech. This line connects all major cities along or close to the Atlantic coast. In September 2012, ONCF started upgrading the Casablanca-Kenitra main line to improve capacity.

The other main link is the Northern East to West link from Oujda via Fes and Meknes to Rabat connecting to the N-S tracks in Kenitra.

For the (main) destinations where there is no train service (yet) the ONCF operates their own bus company Supratours offering connecting bus services from the nearest railway station to places like Agadir, Tétouan or Essaouira

Towns served by railways

Extensions
A major investment program upgrades and extends the network. In 2009, a branch-line of the E-W link was completed, running from Taourirt for 100 km to Nador. This track runs down from the Rif mountains to sealevel at Nador. Most of the route from Taourirt follows the same route as the National Road 19. The tracks through Nador are underground and after Nador Ville the track continues to the Nador Port in Bin Anşār above ground again. This new branch-line is used for both passenger and freight trains with several passenger trains serving Fez, Rabat to Casablanca or to Tanger. There are 6 trains per day: some demanding change at Taourirt wye - others provide direct services up to Casablanca. The night-train (dep. 19:47 from Nador) doesn't even stop at Taourirt and thus doesn't have to change travel-direction.

Another project completed in 2010 is a short-cut between Rabat and Tangier. When completed trains can run directly to Rabat and Casablanca without having to use the longer route via Sidi Kasim. Also in the north a new track is built between Tanger and Ras R'Mel.

Other routes under construction are:
 Casablanca to El-Jadida
 Bypass via Meknes, on the Rabat-Fes route

Not yet under construction, but planned are:
 Marrakech - Agadir, and then an extension further south to Laâyoune
 Oued Zem - Beni Mellal
The most important project is the development of a "high-speed link" (TGV) from Tangier via Rabat and Casablanca to Marrakech. The main contractor of this project is French company Alstom. The French president Nicolas Sarkozy was guest on 29 September 2011 when the actual construction of the line started. The first phase of the project is expected to be completed in 2012

Freight 
Oujda railway station is the last station for passengers on the east–west link. The lines south of Oudja are for freight only and until the passenger-service starts the link Tanger-Tanger MED is also only operated for freight: mainly for the Renault factory at the port

Railway links to adjacent countries 
 There was a link to Algeria, but the border is now closed.
 Melilla, Spain - train terminates at Nador Port, within walking distance of Melilla.

Services
The company makes a difference between the long-distance "Grandes Lignes", high-speed shuttle trains between Rabat and Casablanca, Urban transport in the Casablanca region and the "train by road" via daughter-company Supratours

On the mainline (Grand Lignes) several trains are operated per day. In the first class all chairs are assigned seats. On three main routes the ONCF operate special night trains with either full beds in private rooms of couchettes. On the Oujda-Casablanca route they run a "hotel train" which only offers beds and couchettes, no seats. These "Voyage de Nuit" is available on:
 Casablanca-Oujda via Rabat, Sale, Fes and Taourirt: Train – Hôtel : Dep. Casablanca: 21:15  Arriving Oujda at 07:00 
 Oujda-Casablanca, Departure: 21:00, Taourirt 22:43, Fes: 03:00 Rabat: 06:15, Casablanca: 07:15

 Marrakech-Tangier via Casablanca, Rabat, Kenitra: Departure: 21:00, Casa: 0:45, Rabat: 1:57, Tanger: 07:25
 Tangier-Marrakech: Tanger:21:05, Kenitra: 2:35, Rabat: 3:15, Casablanca: 4:30, Marrakech: 08:05

 Casablanca - Nador: Departure: 19:45, Fes: 0:15, Nador arrival: 06:00
 Nador-Casablanca: Nador Ville: 19:43, Fes: 01:00, Casablanca: 06:15 (Marrakech: 10:05 with train of 06:50 from Casa)

And on the route Tangier-Nador vv there is no official "night train" with beds or couchettes, but there is a night service from Tangier to Oujda or Nador
 Nador-Tangier: Departure: 17:43, Fes: 01:00 and arrival in Tanger: 07:00
 Tanger-Nador: Departure: 21:35, Fes: 2:30, Taourirt: 7:45, Nador: 09:32

Operations
ONCF operates in three main sectors:
 Passenger transportation; 29.6 million passenger-journeys (2009)
 Goods transportation; 35 million tonnes (2009)
 including phosphates transportation.

Key figures
The turnover of the ONCF was growing, both in passengers and freight, until the decline of the economy in 2007. The number of passengers is still growing but freight figures are down. The total income on passengers (sold train tickets) and freight was in 2009 2.7 billion dirham.

High-speed rail

In September 2006 ONCF proposed a high-speed rail connecting Tangier to Marrakech which will reduce the time of the journey from around 10 hours to only 3 and half hours.
 This service, if approved, may not be in operation until 2035.
In 2007 Systra was appointed to design a 350 km/h alignment between Settat and Marrakech.

This first part of the Atlantique high-speed link will open in 2015. When operational trains with a capacity of 500 passengers will run every hour and even every 30 minutes in the rush-hour. The CEO of the ONCF, Mohammed Rabie Khlie, expects to carry 8 million passengers per year. The high-speed network should be available for the average Moroccan citizen.

In December 2010, a contract was signed with Alstom to provide 14 trainsets based on the TGV Duplex.

Electrified
The network that will carry the high-speed-network, from Tangier via Fes to Rabat and Marrakech are currently already electrified. The lines to the east of Fes are diesel powered only and the majority of the track is single: opposite trains pass each other at selected train-stations.

Investments
For the Tangier-Casablanca line the ONCF will invest 20 billion Moroccan dirham (approx. US$2.5 bln.). Half of this money is needed to construct the track. From the other half 5.6 bln. dirham is needed for technology around the tracks and the remaining 4.4 bln. is needed for the rolling stock.

The funding of this project is coming from the state (4.8 bln. dirham), one billion from the Hasan II fund for social and economic development. France and the rest of Europe will donate some 2 billion dirham. The remaining 12.3 billion dirham is funded via loans under favourable conditions

Other projects
Besides the high-speed link discussed above, the company is also developing other projects, including new rail links and extending the network's reach southwards of Marrakech.  One of the new links recently being constructed is a branch line from Taourirt to Nador.  On 10 July 2009 king Mohammed VI of Morocco opened the two new railway stations in Nador and the line to Taourirt

Affiliations
ONCF is a member of the following organizations:
 International Union of Railways (UIC)
 Arab Union of Railways
 Comité du Transport Ferroviaire Maghrebin (CTFM).

Rolling stock 

In December 2019 and according to a 2018 agreement, ONCF received the first Prima M4 electric locomotives of 30 more units that will be delivered by Alstom.

See also 
 Rail transport in Morocco
 Transport in Morocco
 Strait of Gibraltar crossing
 List of stock used by ONCF

References and notes

External links

 Official website
 Railfan Europe

 
Railway companies of Morocco
Moroccan brands
Rail infrastructure in Morocco
Government-owned railway companies
Government-owned companies of Morocco